Karamanlı is a town in Burdur Province in the Mediterranean region of Turkey. It is the seat of Karamanlı District. Its population is 6,157 (2021).

References

External links
 Municipality's official website 

Populated places in Burdur Province
Towns in Turkey
Karamanlı District